Matti Caspi is an Israeli composer, musician, singer, arranger, and lyricist.  Born in 1949, he is regarded as one of Israel's top popular musicians.

His music's style is informed by classical music, Brazilian and Latin music, jazz, rock and other genres. Sasha Argov was one of the musicians who had a large influence on him; Caspi recorded two albums of his songs in cooperation with Argov.

Biography
Caspi was born in 1949 in Kibbutz Hanita in the Western Galilee, and is of Romanian ancestry on his grandfather's side. He studied piano at the conservatory in Nahariya. 

After his military service he married Galia Superstein, and in less than a year they divorced. In 1972 he met actress (Patty) Doreen Lubetzky, and three years later they got married. They had two children, Brit (born 1981) and Bar (born 1985).

In 1990, following marital difficulties, Caspi separated from his wife and met Raquel Wenger. The new couple emigrated to Canada. The two married in 1994 in California. They had two children, Suyan (born 1992) and Sean (born 1995). Caspi was granted a divorce by the Beverly Hills Rabbinical Court, although at the time the case was still pending in Israel. In 1997 Caspi returned to Israel and appeared in several concerts, including the Arad festival. In 2002, a Tel Aviv court determined that he was still legally married to Doreen at the time he married Raquel in 1994, and found him guilty of bigamy. The court imposed a six-month suspended sentence and a small fine. An appeal to the District Court failed, and in 2004 the original sentence was upheld.

Musical career
As a child, Caspi developed an interest in music through his piano lessons. His first public appearance as a performer was at the age of 16, performing on Kol Yisrael's Teshu'ot Rishonot, a talent show directed at teenagers. He recorded a song, "Leiẓan Kippurim", the following year.

For his mandatory service in the Israel Defense Forces, he performed with the Southern Command Troupe. He formed a trio with two of his friends, Gadi Oron and Ya'akov Noy, called The Three Fat Men. With this trio Caspi came out with his first big hit, "Ani Met" (I am dying).

After Caspi's military service, The Three Fat Men became the They Don't Care trio. In the Yom Kippur War he toured army bases along with Leonard Cohen, who arranged his 1974 song "Lover Lover Lover" with Caspi. During the 1970s he worked closely with Ehud Manor, another Israeli songwriter, and released some of his most popular songs: "Lo Yadati SheTelchi Mimeni" (I Didn't Know You Would Leave Me), "Brit Olam" (Covenant of Love), and "Shir HaYonah" (The Song of the Dove).

Over the next few decades, Caspi had a prolific musical career, released dozens of records and collaborated with some of the biggest and most well known Israeli artists of the time: Shlomo Gronich, Ehud Manor, Yehudit Ravitz, and Shalom Hanoch.

He has released several more albums, of which the latest is Like in a Dance, released in 2017.

Caspi has released close to 1,000 songs, both remakes of older songs and his original creations. His musical style is well known, especially for his harmony and popular writing style. Musicologist Tzipi Fleischer said:
"He is the genius among his fellow artists, he set an important milestone in the history of the music of the world. Caspi has invented his own new musical language. As I sit and analyze his harmonies I find myself amazed all over again each time. The fact that he functions as the performer, arranger and conductor has formed a certain reservedness and introversion, but the truth is that he is a musical wild man. He is the one who promoted sophistication and western standards to the region."

With some Israeli artists (chiefly Riki Gal), he not only took on the role of composer, but also of the producer. For Riki's 1996 album  (I Love You More), he took responsibility for complete production and also songwriting. At least once, at the 1976 Eurovision Song Contest, he also served as a conductor, leading the Netherlands' Metropole Orkest in his composition "Emor Shalom", performed by Chocolate, Menta, Mastik and also arranged by Caspi.

Discography
Caspi has released dozens of albums in the decades he has been working in the Israeli music industry. A list of some of his albums follows.

 
 They Don't Care (1972)
 Behind the Sounds (1973)
 Matti Caspi – the First Solo Album (1974)
 Matti Caspi – the Second Solo Album (1976)
 Side A Side B (1978)
 Another Side (1980)
 Twilight (1981)
 Behind the Sounds 1984 (1984)
 My Second Childhood (1984)
 Side C Side D (1987)
 Crazy Paiz Tropical (1987)
 One to One (1988)
 Matti Caspi sings Sasha Argov / Mattityahu and Alexander (1990)
 Songs in Tomato Sauce (1990)
 The First Time A Caspi / They Don't Care Collection (1992)
 Buba Matti (1992)
 Matti (1993)
 Matti Caspi and Ehud Manor: the Great Songs (1994)
 Cherished Dreams (1995)
 Live in Arad (1997)
 Another World (1998)
 Media Direct Collection (1999)
 Duets (2000)
 Behind the Sounds 2002 (2002)
 Songs of Matti Caspi (2003)
 Ballads (2003)
 The Best (2004)
 You are my Woman (2005)
 Soul Mate (2010)
 Like in a Dance (2017)

 Ze Ze (2021)

References

External links
 Home website
 
 Last.FM pages

1949 births
Living people
20th-century Israeli male singers
Israeli people of Romanian-Jewish descent
Israeli male songwriters
21st-century Israeli male singers
Israeli composers
Eurovision Song Contest conductors